Tom Charles Bruce (born 2 August 1991) is a New Zealand international cricketer who plays in Twenty20 Internationals (T20Is). He is also a first-class cricketer who plays for Central Districts. He attended Wanganui Collegiate School.

Domestic career
In June 2018, he was awarded a contract with Central Districts for the 2018–19 season. In March 2019, he was named as the Burger King Super Smash Men's Player of the Year at the annual New Zealand Cricket awards.

In March 2022, in the 2021–22 Plunket Shield season, Bruce scored his maiden double century in first-class cricket, with 208 not out against Northern Districts.

International career
In December 2016, he was named in New Zealand's T20I squad for their series against Bangladesh. On 3 January 2017 he made his T20I debut for New Zealand against Bangladesh.

References

External links
 

1991 births
Living people
New Zealand cricketers
New Zealand Twenty20 International cricketers
Central Districts cricketers
Sussex cricketers
Sportspeople from Te Kūiti
Cricketers from Waikato